Lara Fritzen Procópio de Amorim (born November 11, 1995) is a Brazilian mixed martial artist who competes in the Flyweight division. She has previously fought in the Ultimate Fighting Championship (UFC).

Background
The daughter of Brazilian jiu-jitsu instructors, Fritzen has been involved in martial arts since her early childhood. She has won multiple Minas Gerais state championships and also Brazilian nationals in lower belt ranks.

Mixed martial arts career

Early career
After going 3–0 as an amateur, Fritzen turned professional in 2015.After turning pro, she compiled a 6–0 record on the regional Brazilian scene, winning the Shooto Brazil Women's Bantamweight Championship at Shooto Brasil 81 against Mariana Morais via unanimous decision and the Shooto Brazil Women's Flyweight Championship against Sidy Rocha at Shooto Brasil 87 via unanimous decision.

Ultimate Fighting Championship
Fritzen made her promotional debut against Karol Rosa at UFC Fight Night: Andrade vs. Zhang on August 31, 2019. She lost a close back and forth fight by split decision, in the process suffering her first career loss.

Fritzen was suspended for 6 months by USADA after she tested positive for ostarine as the result of a urine sample collected out-of-competition on February 17, 2020. Lara provided an open container of a dietary supplement that she was using prior to her positive test, and which she declared on her doping control form for analysis at a WADA-accredited laboratory. Although no prohibited substances were listed on the supplement label, the analysis revealed the presence of ostarine in the product. She was eligible to return on August 17, 2020.

Fritzen faced Molly McCann on February 6, 2021 at UFC Fight Night: Overeem vs. Volkov. She won the fight via unanimous decision.

Fritzen faced Casey O'Neill at UFC on ESPN: The Korean Zombie vs. Ige on June 19, 2021. She lost the bout after being choked unconscious by O'Neill in the third round via rear-naked choke.

On July 2nd, 2021 it was announced that Fritzen was released from the UFC.

Post UFC 
In her first performance after her UFC release, Procópio faced Alana Souza on August 13, 2022 at Fight Pro Championship 2. She won the bout via armbar in the first round.

Championships and accomplishments

Mixed martial arts
Shooto Brazil
Shooto Brazil Flyweight Championship (One time)
Shooto Brazil Bantamweight Championship (One time)

Mixed martial arts record 
 

|-
|Win
|align=center|8–2
|Alana Souza
|Submission (armbar)
|Fight Pro Championship 2
|
|align=center|1
|align=center|3:33
|Bragança Paulista, Brazil
|
|-
|Loss
|align=center| 7–2
|Casey O'Neill
|Technical Submission (rear-naked choke)
|UFC on ESPN: The Korean Zombie vs. Ige
|
|align=center|3
|align=center|2:54
|Las Vegas, Nevada, United States
|
|-
|Win
|align=center| 7–1
|Molly McCann
|Decision (unanimous)
|UFC Fight Night: Overeem vs. Volkov
|
|align=center|3
|align=center|5:00
|Las Vegas, Nevada, United States
|
|-
| Loss
| align=center| 6–1
| Karol Rosa
| Decision (split)
| UFC Fight Night: Andrade vs. Zhang
| 
| align=center| 3
| align=center| 5:00
| Shenzhen, China
| 
|-
| Win
| align=center| 6–0
| Sidy Rocha
| Decision (unanimous)
| Shooto Brasil 87
| 
| align=center| 3
| align=center| 5:00
| Rio de Janeiro, Brazil
| 
|-
| Win
| align=center| 5–0
| Mariana Morais
| Decision (unanimous)
| Shooto Brasil 81
| 
| align=center| 3
| align=center| 5:00
| Rio de Janeiro, Brazil
| 
|-
| Win
| align=center| 4–0
| Mayra Cantuária
| Submission (armbar)
| Shooto Brazil 77
| 
| align=center| 1
| align=center| 3:26
| Guarapari, Brazil
| 
|-
| Win
| align=center| 3–0
| Amanda Caroline
| Decision (unanimous)
| BH Sparta 10
|  
| align=center| 3
| align=center| 5:00
| Vila Velha, Brazil
|
|-
| Win
| align=center| 2–0
| Erica Leidianny Ribeiro
| TKO (punches)
| BH Sparta 8
| 
| align=center| 1
| align=center| 2:39
| Vitória, Brazil
|
|-
| Win
| align=center|1–0
| Bruna Mara
| Submission (armbar)
| Upper Fight MMA Championship 6
| 
| align=center|1
| align=center|2:00
| Vitória, Brazil
|
|-

See also 
 List of female mixed martial artists

References

External links 
 
 

1995 births
Living people
Brazilian female mixed martial artists
Flyweight mixed martial artists
Mixed martial artists utilizing Brazilian jiu-jitsu
Ultimate Fighting Championship female fighters
Sportspeople from Belo Horizonte
Brazilian practitioners of Brazilian jiu-jitsu
People awarded a black belt in Brazilian jiu-jitsu
Female Brazilian jiu-jitsu practitioners
21st-century Brazilian women